Jim Geovedi (born 28 June 1979), is an IT security expert from Indonesia who focuses on the discovery of computer and network security vulnerabilities. BBC News described him as a guy who "doesn't look like a Bond villain... but possesses secrets that some of them might kill for".

Career

Information security

Geovedi co-founded and ran several IT security consulting companies. 
In 2001, he co-founded C2PRO Consulting, providing general IT consulting mostly for government agencies and, in 2004, co-founded Bellua Asia Pacific, (renamed Xynexis International later in 2010) and Noosc Global, a managed security services company. He was part of hackers group that began in 1996 called w00w00, where he met the future co-founder of Bellua, Anthony Zboralski.

He is currently based in London and has been interviewed on issues including: satellite security system, banking security and law enforcement.

Music

Geovedi is also a professional DJ and music producer currently signed with Elektrax Recordings, a Sydney-based Techno label.

Discography (as Jim Geovedi)

Singles 
 Rontok, Elektrax, 2010
 Good, Elektrax, 2011

Remixes 
 Minimalistik – Quasar (Jim Geovedi Remix), BDivision, 2010
 Neat – Taipei (Jim Geovedi Remix), BDivision, 2010
 Simone Barbieri Viale – So You (Jim Geovedi Remix), Elektrax, 2010
 DJ Hi-Shock – Asama Express (Jim Geovedi Remix), Elektrax, 2011

Discography (with SEGO)

Singles 
 Jakarta To Tokyo, Plus Tokyo, 2008
 Bisikan Hati, BDivision, 2009
 Tarian Hujan, BDivision, 2009
 Flu Pagi, Plus Tokyo, 2009
 Trompetz, Backs/ash, 2009
 Tarian Hujan, BDivision, 2009
 A.S.A.L.F.O.K.A.L., Beatworks, 2009
 Playboy Duren Tiga, Cutz, 2009
 Darto Helm, SEGO, 2009
 Muke Loe Bapuk, SEGO, 2009
 Perut Buncit, SEGO, 2009
 Rocker Gagal, BDivision, 2009
 ADM/LSD/THC, SEGO, 2009
 Babon Botak, SEGO, 2009
 Sebisanya, LeftRight Sound, 2017
 Melapar, Android Muziq, 2017
 Misbar, Asia Music, 2017

Remixes 
 Shin Nishimura – Fukafunkacid (SEGO ‘Miyabimania’ Remix), Plus Tokyo, 2008
 Da Others – Viva La Vida! (SEGO ‘Mi Vida Loca’ Remix), Pilot6 Recordings, 2009
 Mehdi D Vs. TheCrosh – Roda (SEGO ‘Roda Gila’ Remix), Cutz, 2009
 Tarot – Substance (SEGO Remix), TKC Music, 2009
 Alejandro Roman – Un Segundo De Tu Vida (SEGO Remix), Cutz, 2009
 Alejandro Roman – El Mundo Del Infinito (SEGO Remix), Cutz, 2009
 Andrea Saenz & Sebastian Reza – Sevilla! (SEGO Remix), Nine Records, 2009
 Tatsu Mihara – Comet (SEGO ‘Minimal Object’ Remix), Plus Tokyo, 2009
 Mhonoral – Voison (SEGO ‘Deus Ex Machina’ Remix), Plus Tokyo, 2009
 J.NO – No More Breath (SEGO Remix), BDivision, 2009
 Timmo – Shumminal (SEGO ‘Gitar Karatan’ Remix + Dub), BDivision, 2009
 Mario Roberti – Slave (Sego Birahi Tinggi Remix), BDivision, 2009
 Simone Barbieri Viale – Sunset (SEGO Remix), Cutz, 2009
 Simone Barbieri Viale – City Jungle (SEGO Remix), Cutz, 2009
 Diego Poblets – Massive Shock (SEGO Remix), Cutz, 2009
 Baramuda & Ginkel – Do It Wrong (Sego ‘Hit The Brick Wall’ Remix), Cutz, 2009
 Ilya Mosolov, Spacebird (SEGO Re-Busted), Cold Busted, 2009
 Ilya Mosolov, Light of Paradise (SEGO Re-Busted), Cold Busted, 2009
 Ilya Mosolov, Pax (SEGO Re-Busted), Cold Busted, 2009
 So Hattori, Tarot – No Limit (SEGO ‘Nambah Dua’ Remix), TKC Music, 2009
 Grunjah – Tighten Your Wings (SEGO ‘Too Tight’ Remix), Quimika, 2009
 Marlon D & Pete Lopez – She’s Obsessed (SEGO Remix), TKC Music, 2009
 So Hattori & Tarot – No Limit (SEGO ‘Nambah Satu’ Remix), TKC Music, 2010
 Shin Nishimura – Phycedelic Technelic (SEGO Remix), Plus Tokyo, 2010
 SEGO – Magic Buffer (SEGO Remix), TKC Music, 2010

Personal life
Geovedi was born in Bandarlampung, Lampung, Indonesia. After graduating from high school (1998-1999), he found himself living on the street without steady work. He later managed to teach himself computer security and programming, despite lacking formal education in the field. Media often use him as an example of how people can become successful in the IT industry by relying on their empirical knowledge and acumen, even without holding university degrees.

He is an Arsenal fan. He is also a fan of death metal and grindcore music. In an interview with Beritagar in 2013, Geovedi revealed that he is a fan of Napalm Death, Brutal Truth, Cannibal Corpse and Deicide.

References

External links
 Jim Geovedi's personal website

Hackers
Computer security specialists
Living people
1979 births